Said Saif Asaad (born Angel Popov (May 31, 1979 in Bulgaria), is a Qatari weightlifter who competed in the Men's 105 kg weight class at the 2000 Summer Olympics and won a bronze medal.

One of eight Bulgarian weightlifters recruited by the Qatar Olympic Committee, Asaad became a Qatari citizen to represent the country in the 2000 Olympics, his old name, Angel Popov, being left behind in the process. Qatar has been known for recruiting sportspeople from other countries, the most notable example being world-class runner Saif Saaeed Shaheen.

After moving to Asia, Asaad has become Asian champion twice as well as winning the 2002 Asian Games. He is also the 2003 world champion. Later he competed at the 2004 Summer Olympics, but finished without a result.

Notes and references

External links
Athens 2004 participant bio

1979 births
Living people
Qatari male weightlifters
Bulgarian emigrants to Qatar
Bulgarian male weightlifters
Weightlifters at the 2000 Summer Olympics
Weightlifters at the 2004 Summer Olympics
Olympic weightlifters of Qatar
Olympic bronze medalists for Qatar
Olympic medalists in weightlifting
Asian Games medalists in weightlifting
Naturalised citizens of Qatar
Weightlifters at the 2002 Asian Games
Weightlifters at the 2006 Asian Games
Medalists at the 2000 Summer Olympics
Asian Games gold medalists for Qatar
Medalists at the 2002 Asian Games
Converts to Islam from Eastern Orthodoxy
World Weightlifting Championships medalists